Northeastern Pennsylvania (NEPA) is a geographic region of the U.S. state of Pennsylvania that includes the Pocono Mountains, the Endless Mountains, and the industrial cities of Scranton, Wilkes-Barre, Pittston, Hazleton, Nanticoke, and Carbondale. A portion of this region is located in the New York City metropolitan area.

Unlike most parts of the Rust Belt, some of these communities are experiencing a modest population increase, and others, including Monroe and Pike counties, rank among the fastest growing areas of Pennsylvania.

Northeastern Pennsylvania borders the Lehigh Valley to its south, Warren County, New Jersey to its east, and Broome County, New York to its north.

Area 
Northeastern Pennsylvania comprises Bradford County, Carbon County, Columbia County, Lackawanna County, Luzerne County, Monroe County, Montour County, Northumberland County, Pike County, Schuylkill County, Sullivan County, Susquehanna County, Wayne County, and Wyoming County.

The region overlaps with the Pocono Mountains, the Endless Mountains, the Wyoming Valley, the Coal Region, Pennsylvania Dutch Country, and, by some definitions, the Lehigh Valley.

: the largest county by area;
: the most populous county

Attractions and entertainment 

Northeastern Pennsylvania is home to PNC Field in Moosic, which hosts the Scranton/Wilkes-Barre RailRiders, the AAA affiliate to Major League Baseball's New York Yankees. Mohegan Sun Arena at Casey Plaza in Wilkes-Barre hosts the American Hockey League's Wilkes-Barre/Scranton Penguins; it previously hosted the Wilkes-Barre/Scranton Pioneers of arena football.

Pocono Raceway in Long Pond holds two NASCAR races annually.

Mohegan Pennsylvania in Plains was Pennsylvania's first casino. Mount Airy Casino Resort in Mount Pocono also offers gambling.

Skiers can find several slopes in the area, including Bear Creek Mountain Resort in Macungie, Blue Mountain Resort (east of Palmerton), Montage Mountain Ski Resort in Scranton, which also operates as a water park during the summer season, Elk Mountain in Union Dale, and Camelback Mountain Resort in Tannersville. Like Montage, it operates as a water park in the off season.

There are several attractions that explore the region's industrial history. Eckley Miners' Village near Hazleton, and the Lackawanna Coal Mine Tour in Scranton highlight the area's coal mining history, while Steamtown National Historic Site and the Electric City Trolley Museum, both in Scranton, focus on transportation history.

The Houdini Museum in Scranton follows Houdini's exploits in the area, as well as the rest of the world. The Scranton Ghost Walk attraction tells of Scranton's paranormal history.  1433 N. Main Avenue, home of the longest running seance event in the United States, "Haunted! Mysteries of the Beyond", was picked by the Pennsylvania Department of tourism as one of the most haunted places in the state.

NEPA is also home to the Northeastern Pennsylvania Philharmonic and Northeastern Pennsylvania Chamber Music Society, the only arts and education organizations in the area to successfully develop a multi-county base of support.

Education

Many well-known universities are located in Northeastern Pennsylvania. Penn State operates campuses in the Wilkes-Barre area, near Scranton and in Hazleton. Colleges in the Scranton area include Marywood University in Dunmore, Lackawanna College in downtown Scranton, and the University of Scranton, in downtown Scranton. Geisinger Commonwealth School of Medicine is the region's only medical school and specifically recruits students from NEPA and surrounding counties.

Wilkes-Barre area colleges include Wilkes University in downtown Wilkes-Barre, King's College also in downtown Wilkes-Barre, Luzerne County Community College in Nanticoke, and Misericordia University in Dallas.

Keystone College in La Plume, St. Tikhon's Orthodox Theological Seminary in South Canaan Township, Clarks Summit University (formerly Baptist Bible College & Seminary) in Clarks Summit, Bloomsburg University in Bloomsburg, and East Stroudsburg University in East Stroudsburg are among the other colleges in the area.

Three college preparatory schools are located in Northeastern Pennsylvania, including Wyoming Seminary in Kingston, Scranton Preparatory School in Scranton, and MMI Preparatory School in Freeland.

Five Catholic high schools are located in Northeastern Pennsylvania. They include Holy Cross High School in Dunmore, which primarily serves Lackawanna County, Luzerne County, Wayne County, Pike County, Susquehanna County, Wyoming County, and Monroe County. The second school is Holy Redeemer High School in Wilkes-Barre, which serves primarily Luzerne County and Wyoming County. The third school is Notre Dame High School, which is located in Stroudsburg. It primarily serves Monroe County. The fourth school is Our Lady of Lourdes Regional School, which is located near the city of Shamokin. The fifth school is St. Gregory the Great Academy, which is a boarding school for boys grades 9–12, specializing in classical education, and located in Elmhurst Township.

Airports 
The only major airport to serve the region is the Wilkes-Barre/Scranton International Airport in Pittston Township. Several smaller airports operate in the area, including Wilkes-Barre Wyoming Valley Airport in Forty Fort, Pocono Mountains Municipal Airport in Tobyhanna, Hazleton Municipal Airport in Hazleton, Tidmore Airport in Pottsville, Stroudsburg-Pocono Airport in East Stroudsburg, Bloomsburg Municipal Airport in Bloomsburg, Cherry Ridge Airport-N30 in Honesdale, Spring Hill Airport-70N in Sterling, Mountain Bay Airpark Inc in Greentown, Flying Dollar Airport in Canadensis, Merritt Field in Muncy Valley, Boehms Field in Greeley, Beltzville Airport in Lehighton, and Skyhaven Airport in Tunkhannock.

References

External links 
Pennsylvania's Northern Coal Field

Pocono Mountains
Regions of Pennsylvania